Symbols of the United Kingdom, the Channel Islands and the Isle of Man is a list of the national symbols of the United Kingdom, its constituent countries (England, Scotland, Wales and Northern Ireland), and the Crown Dependencies (the Channel Islands and the Isle of Man). Each separate entry has its own set of unique symbols.

United Kingdom of Great Britain and Northern Ireland

England, Scotland, Wales and Northern Ireland

Crown Dependencies

Channel Islands

Bailiwick of Jersey

Bailiwick of Guernsey

Isle of Man

See also
 United Kingdom
 England
 Northern Ireland
 Scotland
 Wales
 Crown Dependencies
 Channel Islands
 Isle of Man
 List of British flags
 United Kingdom – Symbols
 Channel Islands – Culture
 List of national animals – United Kingdom
 National emblem – Plants (National flora)
 National symbols of England
 National symbols of Scotland
 National symbols of Northern Ireland
 National symbols of Wales
 Symbols of the British Overseas Territories
 National symbols of Ireland, the Republic of Ireland and Northern Ireland

References

United Kingdom
 
National symbols
National symbols
National symbols
National symbols
National symbols
National symbols
National symbols